The 2014 STP 500 was a NASCAR Sprint Cup Series stock car race that was held on March 30, 2014, at Martinsville Speedway in Ridgeway, Virginia. Contested over 500 laps on the  oval, it was the sixth race of the 2014 NASCAR Sprint Cup Series. Kurt Busch won the race, his first win with Stewart-Haas Racing, breaking an 83-race winless streak. Jimmie Johnson finished second, while Dale Earnhardt Jr., Joey Logano, and Marcos Ambrose rounded out the top five. The top rookies of the race were Austin Dillon (15th), Justin Allgaier (23rd), and Kyle Larson (27th).

Previous week's race
On the final lap of the Auto Club 400, Kyle Busch passed his brother Kurt Busch and held off a hard charging rookie Kyle Larson to win the race. "Holy cow, what do you expect when you have a green-white-checkered finish and everyone comes down pit road to put on four tires," Busch said. "That's a Days of Thunder thing right there. What do you mean, there's two laps to go, everybody is to pit, Cole. I came off the fourth turn in disbelief that we won this thing, because we were mediocre all day. It was really weird for us, not a race that we're typically used to. But now there's a load off your shoulders that you can go out the rest of the season and race the way you want to." After winning his first Nationwide Series race the previous day, Larson stated that it had "been a really good weekend" and that he had been battling "probably a 12th place car for most of the day".

Report

Background

The track's turns are banked at eleven degrees, while the front stretch, the location of the finish line, has a zero degree banking. Like the front stretch, the backstraightaway also doesn't have a banked surface. The defending race winner was Jimmie Johnson.

Entry list
The entry list for the STP 500 was released on Monday, March 24 at 9:03 a.m. Eastern time. Forty-four drivers were entered for the race.

Practice

Qualifying

Busch felt that his car seemed "to be working well right now, whatever is working" but felt that he had "to be a little bit faster. There's still some speed to be gained and some consistency throughout races as well keeping speed throughout a run. There's room for improvement still". David Reutimann failed to qualify for the race. Rain washed out the two other practice sessions that were due to be held the day before the race.

Qualifying results

Race

First half

Start
The race began at 1:13 p.m. Eastern time with Kyle Busch leading the field to the green flag from the outside line on the initial start. With the tight confines of Martinsville, it did not take long for the first caution of the race to wave. It flew on lap 2 after Parker Kligerman hit the back of Martin Truex Jr. and spun out in turn 3. A number of cars towards the back were on pit road for damage sustained in a classic Martinsville accordion effect. The race restarted on lap 11, before Matt Kenseth took the lead on lap 17. Jimmie Johnson took the lead on lap 21 and held the lead to the competition caution on lap 41 due to overnight rain. Travis Kvapil stayed out to lead a lap before giving the lead back to Johnson. Brad Keselowski was exiting pit road when he collided with Kasey Kahne who was entering. The bulk of the damage came when Kurt Busch clipped the right side of Keselowski's car. He was forced to take his car to the garage. Keselowski felt that Busch "just accelerated and drove through us, absolutely drove through us" and that he was "tired of his recklessness".

Tempers flaring
The race restarted on lap 48, with Kenseth retaking the lead on lap 56. Kyle Busch took back the lead on lap 59, before the lead cycled to Joey Logano on lap 65, and back to Johnson on lap 82. Keselowski returned to the track for a payback move at Kurt Busch; he gave out the middle finger until Kurt Busch bumped him out of the way. Keselowski's car ultimately left a tire mark on the left side of Kurt Busch's car. After the race, Kurt Busch stated that he had "steered right to go around Brad and he clobbers our left-side door" and later described Keselowski's move as "punk-ass" and that he "will get what he gets back when I decide to give it back". The two drivers battled for 17 laps in total. Ricky Stenhouse Jr. wheel-hopped the curb in turn 1 trying to avoid ramming Kurt Busch and scraped the wall, which brought out the third caution of the race on lap 103. Matt Kenseth beat Jimmie Johnson off pit road to take the lead for the restart, on lap 110.

Cautions breed cautions
Logano took back the lead on lap 111, before the fourth caution of the race flew on lap 114 after Kvapil clipped Michael Annett going into turn 3, with the incident also involving David Gilliland. From the restart at lap 120, Logano maintained the lead until lap 133, when Johnson returned to the head of the race. Greg Biffle became the race's next leader on lap 155, and held the lead until the fifth caution of the race flew on lap 170 after Casey Mears got tapped by Gilliland in turn 1 and sent him spinning. Marcos Ambrose beat Biffle off pit road to take the lead for the restart on lap 179. Ambrose led until on lap 195 when Kenseth passed him. The sixth caution of the race flew on lap 200 after Dale Earnhardt Jr. tapped Jamie McMurray in turn 2 and sent his car into the wall. Kenseth led the field to the restart on lap 208, before Johnson returned to the lead on lap 213.

Second half

Halfway

The seventh caution of the race flew on lap 219 after Alex Bowman got hit in the rear by Gilliland and rear-ended the wall in turn 4. Earnhardt Jr. stayed out on track while others pitted for tires, and thus took the lead for the restart, on lap 226. A short green-flag run followed before debris in turn 1 brought out the eighth caution of the race on lap 231. Kevin Harvick's run of mechanical mishaps continued when he was forced to pit because of a broken rear-end chain. Earnhardt Jr. still led the field for the restart on lap 238, before Kurt Busch took the lead on lap 243. Johnson returned to the front on lap 245, before the ninth caution of the race flew at the halfway mark, after Ryan Truex was sent spinning into the turn 4 wall. Harvick stayed out to lead a lap before pitting and the lead cycled back to Kenseth for the restart, on lap 258.

Closing stages
Earnhardt Jr. took back the lead on lap 260, before Johnson (lap 265) and Clint Bowyer (lap 284) both went to the head of the race. Johnson retook the lead on lap 288, and held the top spot until the next caution, the 10th, flew on lap 315 after Joe Nemechek hit the wall in turn 4. The race restarted on lap 323, and Johnson stayed out front until the 11th caution of the race flew on lap 340 after Kyle Larson got loose and spun out exiting turn 2. The race restarted on lap 347, with Bowyer and Johnson swapping the lead before a piece of debris brought out the 12th caution of the race on lap 349. Johnson maintained the lead from the restart on lap 358 to the 13th caution of the race, which flew with 90 laps to go after Martin Truex Jr. got turned by Keselowski in turn 2.

Finish
The race restarted with 83 laps to go, with Johnson leading until 51 laps to go, when Bowyer assumed the lead. The 14th caution of the race flew with 42 laps to go after Carl Edwards got loose and spun out in turn 2. Bowyer and Johnson swapped the lead on pit road, as Johnson won the race off to take the lead. The race restarted with 35 laps to go, and was passed by Kurt Busch 7 laps later. Johnson had another spell out front with 18 laps to go, but Kurt Busch took the lead back with 11 laps to go and held off Johnson to end his 83-race winless streak, and achieved his 25th career victory. Busch stated that he "didn't know if we'd be able to do it, you know? The 48 car is king here, him or the 24", and that he had "been on this journey for a while and every time you come to Martinsville, you just kind of draw a line through it like there's no way I'll be able to challenge those Hendrick guys or be up in the top 10. This Stewart-Haas team gave me a car to do it." Johnson, who led 296 laps, stated that his car was "so on edge slipping and sliding" and that a "lack of security in our own car kept us from feeling more racy and putting a bumper to someone or really getting inside someone aggressively".

Race results

Race statistics
 Lead changes: 33 among different drivers
 Cautions/Laps: 14 for 92
 Red flags: 0
 Time of race: 3 hours, 38 minutes, and 38 seconds
 Average speed:

Media

Television

Radio

Standings after the race

Drivers' Championship standings

Manufacturers' Championship standings

Note: Only the first sixteen positions are included for the driver standings.

Notes

References

STP 500
STP 500
STP 500
NASCAR races at Martinsville Speedway